Gurteen (also spelled Gorteen, Gortin), an Irish placename, may refer to:

Villages
Gurteen, County Galway, village in east County Galway
Gorteen, village in County Sligo, often spelled Gurteen
Gortin, village in County Tyrone

Townlands
Gorteen (Gorteenagarry), townland in County Cavan
Gorteen, Templeport, townland in County Cavan
Gurteen, County Tipperary, townland in County Tipperary
Gurteen, townland in Glencar, County Leitrim, often spelled Gurteen

Other
Gurteen Beach, a beach in County Galway
Gurteen College, an agricultural college in County Tipperary
Gurteen railway station in County Cork